The 1920–21 Swiss National Ice Hockey Championship was the 11th edition of the national ice hockey championship in Switzerland. HC Rosey Gstaad won the championship by defeating Akademischer EHC Zürich in the final.

First round

Eastern Series

Western Series

Semifinals 
 HC Bellerive Vevey - HC La Villa 2:1
 HC Rosey Gstaad - HC Château-d'Oex 2:1

Final 
HC Rosey Gstaad - HC Bellerive Vevey 7:0

HC Rosey Gstaad qualified for the final.

Final 
 HC Rosey Gstaad - Akademischer EHC Zürich 12:6

External links 
Swiss Ice Hockey Federation – All-time results

National
Swiss National Ice Hockey Championship seasons